Konstantinos Versis (1901–1941) was a Greek Army officer and hero of World War II.

Life
Versis was born in Athens in 1901. He participated as a 2nd Lieutenant of the Greek Artillery in the Greco-Turkish War, during the last year of operations (1922). According to war reports he was distinguished on battlefield.

On 28 October 1940, when Greece entered World War II, he was positioned in Epirus, as a commander of the 1st Battery of the Vth Artillery Regiment, part of the 8th Infantry Division. During the Fascist Italian invasion at the sector of Elaia–Kalamas he participated in the defense and his battery and inflicted serious damage to the attacking enemy, who was soon repulsed from Greek soil. During the next months he participated in the counter offensive, which resulted in the successful advance of the Greek forces deep into enemy-held territory.

After the German invasion in support of Fascist Italy, in April 1941, the front collapsed and Greek Army capitulated. As part of the capitulation terms the Greek soldiers had to surrender their guns to the Germans, at April 26. Versis, who was still positioned in Epirus, rejected such a humiliating turn of events and as a final act of heroism ordered his men to collect the guns of his battery and then to sing the National Anthem looking south, where the rest of Greece lies. After saluting his guns he ordered to set them on fire, while during the explosions he committed suicide.

Legacy

In honor of his distinguished wartime activity, the 2010 graduate class of the Evelpidon Military Academy bears his name.

References

1901 births
1941 deaths
Greek military personnel of World War II
Hellenic Army officers
Greek military personnel who committed suicide
Military personnel from Athens